{{Not to be confused with|text=unicolored thrush}}

Tickell's thrush (Turdus unicolor'') is a passerine bird in the thrush family Turdidae. It is common in open forest in the Himalayas, and migrates seasonally into peninsular India, Nepal and rarely to Bangladesh. 

The name commemorates the British ornithologist Samuel Tickell who collected in India and Burma.

Characteristics 

Males of the Tickell's thrush have uniform blue-grey upperparts, a whitish belly and vent. Adults have yellow beak and legs while it may be darker in juveniles. There is a yellow eye-ring which is thinner and fainter than the Indian black bird which is usually bigger in size. Females and young birds have browner upperparts.

Distribution and habitat 

The Tickell's thrush is omnivorous, eating a wide range of insects, earthworms and berries. It nests in bushes. It does not form flocks, but loose groups of two to five.

Populations move further south in India and Nepal in winter.

References

Tickell's thrush
Birds of Pakistan
Birds of North India
Birds of Nepal
Birds of Bhutan
Tickell's thrush